The event was held on February 22, 2002 at Park City Mountain Resort.

Results
Complete results from the women's giant slalom event at the 2002 Winter Olympics.

References

External links
 Official Olympic Report

Giant slalom